is a Japanese women's shogi player ranked 2-dan.

Women's shogi professional

Yamane's first appearance in a major title match came in May 2021 when she challenged Kana Satomi for 32nd  title (MayJune 2021). Yamane lost the match 3 games to none.

Promotion history
Yamane's promotion history is as follows.
 3-kyū: October 1, 2013
 2-kyū: May 24, 2014
 1-kyū: June 26, 2014
 1-dan: April 1, 2015
 2-dan: October 23, 2019

Note: All ranks are women's professional ranks.

Major titles and other championships
Yamane has appeared in one major title match, but has yet to win a major title. Yamane has won one official non-title women's professional shogi tournament.

Awards and honors
Yamane won the Japan Shogi Association's Annual Shogi Award for "Excellent Women's Professional" for the 20202021 shogi year.

References

External links
 ShogiHub: Yamane, Kotomi

Japanese shogi players
Living people
Women's professional shogi players
Professional shogi players from Ehime Prefecture
People from Matsuyama, Ehime
1998 births